Rymnio is a village located in Aiani municipal unit, Kozani regional unit, in the Greek region of Macedonia. It is situated on the south shore of the Aliakmon River at an altitude of 330 meters.  The postal code is 50500, while the telephone code is +30 24640. At the 2011 census, the population was 161. 

The town of Kozani, the seat of the region, is 29 km from Rymnio.

References

Populated places in Kozani (regional unit)